Gannit Ankori (Hebrew: גנית אנקורי) is an Israeli art historian.  She is Professor of Fine Arts and Chair in Israeli Art at the Department of Fine Arts at Brandeis University.  She was previously chair of the Department of Art History at Hebrew University in Jerusalem.

Ankori studies gender studies, Palestinian art, and the art of the  Jewish diaspora.

Ankori is regarded as a "champion" of Palestinian art and has devoted two decades of her career to the study of Palestinian art  which she views as a continuous artistic tradition before and after the Nakba of 1948.
Her sister is the actress Gilat Ankori.

Books
She has published extensively in the fields of Mexican, Palestinian, and Israeli art, as well as feminist cultural studies. Her articles have been printed in Hebrew, Arabic, French, German, and English.

 Palestinian art,  Reaktion Books, 2006
 Imaging her selves: Frida Kahlo's poetics of identity and fragmentation,  Greenwood Press, 2002
 The Fractured Self: Identity and Fragmentation in the Art of Frida Kahlo,'' 1994

Articles

 Yocheved Weinfeld's portraits of the self, Gannit Ankori, (Woman's Art Journal, vol. 10 no.2, 1989)

References

Israeli art historians
Living people
Academic staff of the Hebrew University of Jerusalem
Brandeis University faculty
Year of birth missing (living people)
Women art historians
21st-century Israeli women
20th-century Israeli women
Israeli women academics